Amar Benikhlef (born 11 January 1982) is an Algerian judoka who competed in the middleweight division. He won the silver medal at the 2008 Summer Olympics in Beijing. In September 2021,  Benikhlef was suspended for 10 years, until July 2031.

Biography

After a judoka he coached, Fethi Nourine, was selected to compete at the 2020 Summer Games in the -73 kg weight class, Nourine and Benikhlef each announced Nourine's withdrawal following the conclusion of the draw of competitors.  They said the withdrawal was because they were  supporting the Palestinian cause by not competing against Israeli Tohar Butbul, a much more accomplished judoka than Nourine and the # 5 seed in the tournament, whom Nourine was drawn to potentially face in the second round, had he won in the first round. The IJF announced his and Nourine's immediate suspensions on 24 July 2021, pending a further investigation, and sent the two of them back home to Algeria from Tokyo. The Federation explained: "According to the IJF rules, in line with the Olympic Charter and especially with rule 50.2 that provides for the protection of the neutrality of sport at the Olympic Games and the neutrality of the Games themselves, which states that 'no kind of demonstration or political, religious or racial propaganda is permitted in any Olympic sites, venues or other areas,' Fethi Nourine and Amar Benikhlef are now suspended and will face a decision by the IJF Disciplinary Commission, as well as disciplinary sanctions by the National Olympic Committee of Algeria back in their country.'" It continued: "Judo sport is based on a strong moral code, including respect and friendship, to foster solidarity and we will not tolerate any discrimination, as it goes against the core values and principles of our sport." The Federation Disciplinary Commission will handle final sanctioning beyond the Olympics. In September 2021, Benikhlef was  suspended for 10 years, until July 2031.

Achievements

References

External links
 
 

1982 births
Living people
Algerian male judoka
Judoka at the 2004 Summer Olympics
Judoka at the 2008 Summer Olympics
Olympic judoka of Algeria
Olympic silver medalists for Algeria
Olympic medalists in judo
Sportspeople from Algiers
Medalists at the 2008 Summer Olympics
Mediterranean Games bronze medalists for Algeria
Competitors at the 2009 Mediterranean Games
African Games silver medalists for Algeria
African Games medalists in judo
Mediterranean Games medalists in judo
Competitors at the 2007 All-Africa Games
21st-century Algerian people